The Adventurers' Guild Tome is a supplement for fantasy role-playing games published by Adventurers' Guild in 1987.

Contents
The Adventurers' Guild Tome is a sourcebook containing portraits of over 300 various non-player characters, 1000 names for fantasy characters, and 100 diagrams of weapons and armor.

Publication history
The Adventurers' Guild Tome was written by Brett Dougherty, with art by Mike Bjornson, and was published by Adventurers' Guild in 1987 as a 44-page book.

Reviews
Stewart Wieck, the editor-in-chief of White Wolf Magazine, stated in 1988 that, although of "lesser quality, the character pictures could be used as visuals to help players focus on the fact that they are talking to an actual person, not a faceless bystander." He also observed that, "If you have trouble naming characters, then the list will do you good. The diagrams are interesting and apparently historically accurate.

References

Fantasy role-playing game supplements
Role-playing game supplements introduced in 1987